Pteruchus africanus is a pollen organ of a seed fern (Pteridospermatophyta). It was first described by Hamshaw Thomas  from the Umkomaas locality of South Africa.

Description 
The pollen organs Pteruchus africanus differ from other species of Pteruchus in small size, and equant blade supporting the pollen sacs.

Whole plant reconstructions 
Pteruchus africanus may have been produced by the same plant as Umkomasia macleanii (ovulate organs) and Dicroidium odontopteroides (leaves), based on cuticular similarities between these leaves and reproductive structures at the Umkomaas locality of South Africa.

References 

Triassic plants
Pteridospermatophyta